Dennis Sullivan (28 January 1883 – 28 December 1968) was an English cricketer who played first-class cricket for Surrey and Glamorgan from 1914 to 1928. A wicketkeeper, he also represented Wales in first-class cricket.

Dennis Sullivan did not establish himself in the first-class game until he became Glamorgan's wicket-keeper in 1924, when he was 41. He continued as Glamorgan's chief wicket-keeper until 1928. He also made two first-class tours of Jamaica in 1926/27 and 1927/28 in teams led by Lionel Tennyson.

Sullivan's son Les became a footballer.

References 

1883 births
1968 deaths
People from Mitcham
English cricketers
Glamorgan cricketers
Surrey cricketers
Wales cricketers
Players cricketers
L. H. Tennyson's XI cricket team
English cricketers of 1919 to 1945
Wicket-keepers